Chieveley services is a UK motorway service station just off the M4 motorway at Chieveley near Newbury in Berkshire, England. It is owned by Moto. It is situated on the A34 between Oxford and Winchester just off Junction 13 of the M4 (so that there is just one service area and not twin services on each side of the motorway). Thus it is used by traffic on both roads.

History
This service area was not originally signed along the M4 as it was not operating 24 hours a day. Since the upgrade of the motorway junction, it is now signed.

Incidents 

 Murder of Céline Figard

References

External links
Moto official website — Chieveley
Motorway Services Online - Chieveley
Motorway Services Info — Chieveley

Buildings and structures completed in 1986
M4 motorway service stations
Moto motorway service stations
Buildings and structures in Berkshire
Transport in Berkshire
Chieveley